Alejandro "Alex" Mendoza (born April 25, 1977) is an American former Marine, owner of a lawn care business and democratic socialist politician from Dallas, Texas, who was the vice presidential nominee of Socialist Party USA in the 2012 elections. Mendoza, of Texas, ran with Stewart Alexander of California for president. Mendoza is currently serving as the State Chair for the Socialist Party of Texas.

Mendoza was born in Riverside, California to parents who emigrated from Mexicali, Baja California, Mexico. Mendoza graduated from Palm Springs High School in 1995. Shortly after graduation, Mendoza joined the United States Marine Corps, and served with the 5th Marine Regiment for four years. Mendoza moved to Texas shortly after leaving the corps. Mendoza has spent the previous years working in the Information Technology field and has worked all over the world (Mexico, Colombia, Brazil, England, and Argentina). Mendoza is now an independent business owner of a local sustainable lawn care business.

References 

1977 births
Living people
Businesspeople from Texas
People from Fort Worth, Texas
Socialist Party USA vice presidential nominees
Texas socialists
United States Marines
University of Texas at Dallas alumni
2012 United States vice-presidential candidates
21st-century American politicians
People from Riverside, California
American politicians of Mexican descent
Palm Springs High School people